is a city located in Saitama Prefecture, Japan. , the city had an estimated population of 55,294 in 24,328 households and a population density of 1200 persons per km².

Geography
Hidaka is located in south-central Saitama Prefecture.

Surrounding municipalities
Saitama Prefecture
 Kawagoe
 Sakado
 Hannō
 Tsurugashima
 Sayama
 Moroyama

Climate
Hidaka has a Humid subtropical climate (Köppen Cfa) characterized by warm summers and cool winters with light to no snowfall.  The average annual temperature in Hidaka is 14.3 °C. The average annual rainfall is 1427 mm with September as the wettest month. The temperatures are highest on average in August, at around 26.2 °C, and lowest in January, at around 3.4 °C.

Demographics
Per Japanese census data, the population of Hidaka has remained relatively stable over the past 30 years.

History
The area of modern-day Hidaka was part of ancient Koma District, Musashi Province, mentioned in records dating from 716 AD as a place of resettlement for refugees from the Tang invasion of the Kingdom of Goguryeo on the Korean peninsula in 668 AD. During the Edo period, the area developed as Takahagi-shuku, a post station on the Nikkō Wakiōkan highway linking Edo with Nikkō. The three villages of Komagawa, Koma and Takahagi were established within Koma District with the establishment of the modern municipalities system on April 1, 1889. In 1896 Koma District was abolished, becoming part of Iruma District. On February 11, 1955 Komagawa and Koma merged to create the town of Hidaka. Takahagi joined Hidaka on September 20, 1956. Hidaka was elevated to city status on October 1, 1991.

Government
Hidaka has a mayor-council form of government with a directly elected mayor and a unicameral city council of 16 members. Hidaka contributes one member to the Saitama Prefectural Assembly. In terms of national politics, the city is part of Saitama 9th district of the lower house of the Diet of Japan.

Economy
The economy of Hidaka remains primarily agricultural, with some light manufacturing. A number of  housing districts have been built near the train stations, as the city is increasing a bedroom community for Tokyo metropolis to the south.

Education
Saitama Women's Junior College 
 Hidaka has six public elementary schools and six public middle schools operated by the city government, and one public high school operated by the Saitama Prefectural Board of Education. The prefecture also operates one special education school for the handicapped.

Transportation

Railway
 JR East –  Hachikō Line

 JR East – Kawagoe Line
 - 
 Seibu Railway - Seibu Ikebukuro Line
  -

Highway

Sister city relations
  Osan, Gyeonggi-do, South Korea  (1996)

Local attractions
 Kinchakuda Plateau
Koma Shrine

References

External links

Official Website 

Cities in Saitama Prefecture
Hidaka, Saitama